Presidential elections were held in El Salvador on 30 January 1856. Rafael Campos ran unopposed was and elected by the citizenry, the first popular election in Salvadoran history.

Results

References

El Salvador
President
Election and referendum articles with incomplete results
Presidential elections in El Salvador
Single-candidate elections